Elliott Mason (29 January 1888 – 20 June 1949) was a British stage and film actress. She was sometimes credited as Elliot Mason.

After making her screen debut in the 1935 comedy The Ghost Goes West, Mason appeared regularly in supporting roles for the next decade. She worked on several films made at Ealing Studios including The Ghost of St. Michael's, where her seemingly respectable character turns out to be a German spy, and Turned Out Nice Again in which she plays a domineering mother-in-law. Her final appearance was in the 1946 prisoner-of-war drama The Captive Heart.

Filmography

References

Bibliography
 Barr, Charles. Ealing Studios. University of California Press, 1998.

External links

1888 births
1949 deaths
British stage actresses
British film actresses
Actresses from Glasgow
20th-century British actresses